Calvin Edward Pratt (1828–1896) was an American lawyer and judge. He also served in the Union Army during the American Civil War as Major, Colonel, and finally Brigadier General.

References

Sources 

 Warner, Ezra J. (1964). "Calvin Edward Pratt". Generals in Blue: Lives of the Union Commanders. Baton Rouge: Louisiana State University Press. p. 385.
 "Calvin E. Pratt". Historical Society of the New York Courts. Retrieved March 17, 2023.

Further reading 

 "Judge Pratt on the Medical Witness". The New York Times. June 2, 1881. p. 2, col. 7.
 "Justice C. E. Pratt Dead". The New York Times. August 4, 1896. p. 9, cols. 3–4.
 "The Appellate Justices". The New York Times. October 9, 1895. p. 7, col. 7.

External links 

 "Calvin E. Pratt". Find a Grave. November 15, 2010. Retrieved March 17, 2023.

1828 births
1896 deaths
Union Army generals